Onoba kergueleni is a species of minute sea snail, a marine gastropod mollusk or micromollusk in the family Rissoidae.

Distribution

Description 
The maximum recorded shell length is 3.11 mm.

Habitat 
Minimum recorded depth is 27 m. Maximum recorded depth is 480 m.

References

 Ponder, W. F. (1983) Rissoaform gastropods from the Antarctic and sub-Antarctic: the Eatoniellidae, Rissoidae, Barleeidae, Cingulopsidae, Orbitestellidae and Rissoellidae (Mollusca: Gastropoda) of Signy Island, South Orkney Islands, with a review of the Antarctic and sub-Antarctic (excluding southern South America and the New Zealand sub-Antarctic islands) species. British Antarctic Survey, Scientific Reports 108: 1-96
 Ponder, W. F. (1985). A review of the Genera of the Rissoidae (Mollusca: Mesogastropoda: Rissoacea). Records of the Australian Museum supplement 4: 1-221

External links

Rissoidae
Gastropods described in 1875